This article is about the particular significance of the year 1943 to Wales and its people.

Incumbents

Archbishop of Wales – Charles Green, Bishop of Bangor
Archdruid of the National Eisteddfod of Wales – Crwys

Events
19 January - Three-year-old twins Neil and Jacqueline Coleby die of exposure on the slopes of Caerneddau; despite an extensive search their bodies are not found until 24 January.
29 January - In the by-election for the University of Wales parliamentary seat vacated by Ernest Evans, there are three notable candidates. W. J. Gruffydd, a former vice-president of Plaid Cymru who has subsequently joined the Liberal Party, triumphs over Plaid's Saunders Lewis. One of the other candidates is Alun Talfan Davies.
March - Rocky Marciano is among US servicemen posted to South Wales.
23 October - David Lloyd George marries his long-term mistress and secretary, Frances Stevenson, at Guildford register office.
Sir Percy Thomas is elected President of the Royal Institute of British Architects for the second time - the second person ever to achieve this.
Tenovus Cancer Care is founded in Cardiff as Tenovus, initially funding a wide range of projects in the local area; it becomes the leading cancer charity in Wales.

Arts and literature
August - Soprano Ceinwen Rowlands gives the first performance of a Welsh translation of Felix Mendelssohn’s Lobgesang at the National Eisteddfod of Wales in Bangor.
The Welsh National Opera company is founded in Cardiff.
Dame Laura Knight paints Ruby Loftus Screwing a Breech Ring at the Royal Ordnance Factory, Newport.

Awards
National Eisteddfod of Wales (held in Caernarfon)
National Eisteddfod of Wales: Chair - David Emrys James
National Eisteddfod of Wales: Crown - Dafydd Owen
National Eisteddfod of Wales: Prose Medal - withheld

New books

English language
Idris Davies - The Angry Summer: A Poem of 1926
Margiad Evans - Autobiography
William Evans (Wil Ifan) - A Quire of Rhymes
R. T. Jenkins - Orinda
Eiluned Lewis - The Captain's Wife

Welsh language
Rhys Davies - Pobl a Phethau
Sir Emrys Evans - Ewthaffron: Criton (translation from Plato)
Alwyn D. Rees - Adfeilion

Music
Harry Parr-Davies  - The Lisbon Story (musical, opened in the West End 17 June 1943)
Arwel Hughes - Anatiomaros
W. S. Gwynn Williams - Tosturi Duw (God's Mercy)

Film
Ray Milland stars in Forever and a Day and The Crystal Ball.
Drama documentary The Silent Village, filmed in 1942 at Cwmgiedd near Ystradgynlais by Humphrey Jennings, is released.

Broadcasting
4 September – Wynford Vaughan-Thomas reports from a bomber over Berlin for BBC Radio.

Births

13 January – Lorna Sage, academic, literary critic and writer (died 2001)
1 February – Rosemarie Frankland, beauty queen (died 2000)
9 February – Ryland Davies, operatic tenor
11 February – Win Griffiths MP, politician
28 February – John Davies, bishop of St Asaph
3 March (in London) – Aeronwy Thomas, literary figure (died 2009)
1 April (in Derby) – Dafydd Wigley MP, politician
9 April – Clive Sullivan, rugby league footballer (died 1985)
16 April (in Norwich) – Ruth Madoc (née Llewellyn), actress and singer (died 2022)
17 April – Elinor Bennett, harpist
26 April – Leon Pownall, actor and director (died 2006)
27 April
David Hughes, footballer 
Gwyn Prosser MP, politician
6 June – Sir Terry Matthews, entrepreneur
5 July – Roy Evans, footballer (died 1969)
7 July – Robert East, actor
19 July – Beth Morris, actress (died 2018)
2 August – Alun Michael MP, politician
17 August – John Humphrys, radio and TV journalist
24 August – Dafydd Iwan, musician and politician
10 September – Shân Legge-Bourke, born Elizabeth Shân Bailey, landowner
27 September – Max Boyce, entertainer
18 October (in London) – Dai Jones, Welsh-language broadcaster (died 2022)
15 November – Derec Llwyd Morgan, academic
16 November – Val Lloyd AM, politician
22 December – Gareth Morgan, organizational theorist
28 December – Joan Ruddock MP, politician and campaigner
30 December – Geraint Talfan Davies, journalist and executive
date unknown 
John Beard, painter
Christine Evans, poet
Gareth Griffiths, academic

Deaths
9 January – William Llewellyn Thomas, Wales international rugby player, 70
12 January – Selwyn Biggs, Wales international rugby player and Glamorgan cricketer, 70
24 January – Glyndwr Michael, homeless man whose body was used in Operation Mincemeat, 34 (pneumonia)
31 January – Sir Robert Armstrong-Jones, physician, 85
7 February (in London) – Clara Novello Davies, singer, 71
6 March (in Trevelin) – John Daniel Evans, pioneer in Patagonia, 81
23 March – Commander John Wallace Linton, VC, 37
28 March – Ben Davies, operatic tenor, 85
12 April – Arthur Lloyd James, phonetician, 58 (suicide)
17 April – Alice Gray Jones (Ceridwen Peris), author, 90
8 September – Dai Lewis, Wales international rugby player, 76
15 September – David Samuel, Wales international rugby player
24 September – Billy Douglas, Wales international rugby player, 80
15 October – Sir Thomas Artemus Jones, judge and Welsh language campaigner, 72
29 October – Frank Hancock, Wales international rugby union international, 84
17 November – Bertrand Turnbull, Olympic hockey player, 56
10 December – Ivor Morgan, Wales international rugby union player, 59
27 December – Arthur O'Bree, Glamorgan cricketer, 57

See also
1943 in Northern Ireland

References

Wales